The Giddings–Stone Mansion is a historic mansion located at 204 E. Stone St., Brenham, Texas. It was designed in the Greek Revival architectural style. It has been listed on the National Register of Historic Places since June 24, 1976.

The house was acquired by the Heritage Society of Washington County in 1975.

See also

National Register of Historic Places listings in Washington County, Texas
Recorded Texas Historic Landmarks in Washington County

References

External links

Houses in Washington County, Texas
Greek Revival houses in Texas
Houses on the National Register of Historic Places in Texas
National Register of Historic Places in Washington County, Texas
Houses completed in 1870
Recorded Texas Historic Landmarks
Brenham, Texas
Museums in Washington County, Texas
Historic house museums in Texas